Timothy C. Evans (born June 1, 1943) is an American attorney, politician, former alderman and the current Chief Judge of the Cook County Circuit Court. Evans is noted as the first African-American Chief Judge of the Cook County Circuit Court. A graduate of the John Marshall Law School in Chicago, Evans was first elected to the bench in 1992, and was selected by his fellow judges as Chief Judge in 2001.

Biography

Early life and education
Born the middle of three children in Hot Springs, Arkansas to George and Tiny Marie Evans, his family relocated to Chicago sometime during the great migration. Having attended elementary school in Arkansas, Evans attended Hirsch Metropolitan High School; graduating in 1961. After high school, Evans went on to study at Illinois State University, and later transferred to University of Illinois at Urbana-Champaign where he graduated with a B.S. in zoology. Evans earned his J.D. degree at John Marshall Law School in 1969 and joined the Democratic Party.

Alderman (1973–1991)
Evans was elected alderman of the city's south side 4th Ward in a November 27, 1973 special election to fill the vacancy created six months earlier by the death of Ald. Claude Holman on June 1, 1973. Evans defeated Hattie B. Kay Williams, a 50-year-old executive of the Girl Scouts and civil rights activist by a vote of 6,784 to 3,136.

An ally of mayors Daley, Bilandic, Byrne and Washington, Evans served as floor leader and Chicago City Council Finance Chair during Harold Washington's mayoral administration. Following Washington's death, Evans sought to fill Washington's unexpired term. The Chicago City Council voted to choose Alderman Eugene Sawyer to serve in the interim. Evans continued to serve as alderman. Evans ran as an independent candidate during a special election was held for Mayor of Chicago to fill Washington's term in 1989. Evans received 482,000 votes but eventually lost to Richard M. Daley, son of former multi-term mayor Richard J. Daley. After 18 years in office, in 1991 Evans was defeated for re-election as alderman in the 4th Ward by Toni Preckwinkle.

Cook County Circuit Judge
In 1992, Evans was elected to the bench as judge of Cook County Circuit Court. In September 2001, Evans was elected as the first black Chief Judge of the Cook County Circuit Court succeeding Donald O'Connell.

Personal
Evans has been married to his wife Thelma Evans since November 1969. Evans met his wife during his time at University of Illinois at Urbana-Champaign. Together, they have two twin daughters; Cynthia and Catherine Evans  (b. 1970 or 1971). Evans was inducted into the Arkansas Black Hall of Fame in 2010.

References

Living people
Chicago City Council members
African-American people in Illinois politics
1943 births
John Marshall Law School (Chicago) alumni
Politicians from Hot Springs, Arkansas
African-American judges
Judges of the Circuit Court of Cook County
21st-century African-American people
20th-century African-American people